The Women's 52 kg event at the 2022 World Judo Championships was held at the Humo Ice Dome arena in Tashkent, Uzbekistan on 7 October 2022.

Results

Finals

Repechage

Pool A

Pool B

Pool C

Pool D

References

External links
 

W52
World Judo Championships Women's Half Lightweight
World W52